Rod Dell (born 9 November 1946) is a former Australian rules football player. Dell played 18 games for North Melbourne in the Victorian Football League between 1965 and 1969.

References

External links
 
 

North Melbourne Football Club players
Jacana Football Club players
Australian rules footballers from Victoria (Australia)
1946 births
Living people